Selflessness may refer to:

 Anatta in Buddhism
 Altruism
 Ego loss
 Selflessness: Featuring My Favorite Things, a 1969 jazz album